This is a list of countries that have a land border with only one other country. Some on this list have a maritime border with additional countries: for example Denmark "borders" by sea Sweden, Norway and Canada (between Greenland and Baffin Island); while, in addition to Denmark, Canada also has a sea boundary with France (between the island of Newfoundland and the territory of St. Pierre and Miquelon). Some countries, which are not listed here, have no land border but do have a maritime border with a single other country, such as Sri Lanka.  

There are generally four arrangements by which a country would have a single land border:

 an island divided between two states, such as between Haiti and the Dominican Republic, or between Ireland and the United Kingdom.
 a peninsula or a semi-enclave, where one country has a land border with a neighbouring one but is otherwise surrounded by sea, while the neighbour borders other countries—examples are Portugal (neighbouring Spain), Denmark (neighbouring Germany), and Canada (neighbouring the United States).
 the three countries forming a landlocked true enclave, completely surrounded by a larger country: San Marino and Vatican City (within Italy) and Lesotho (within South Africa).
 a country surrounded by sea and another nation. Examples would be The Gambia surrounded by Senegal and Brunei surrounded by Malaysia. This applies to peninsulas, but also to non-peninsular nations like The Gambia and Brunei.

Territory leased or ceded by one country to another for perpetual use, but not in sovereignty, such as Guantanamo Bay Naval Base in Cuba, or memorials, such as the American Cemetery in France, do not constitute true territorial borders because the land occupied remains a formal part of the host country.

This list is based on the Correlates of War Direct Contiguity data set, with maritime causeways and bridges not being counted.

Countries bordering only one other country

Landlocked

With coast

Causeways, bridges, and tunnels 

Often called fixed crossings or fixed links, transportation corridors constructed to cross bodies of water without any intermittent connections such as ferries or ships may be between different states. These may be considered artificial "persistent" borderpoints for land vehicles or pedestrians, but are not typically considered land borders given their need for continuous operation and maintenance, as well as their ease of volume control or closure by either state. Two countries are islands and have no land borders, but maintain fixed borderpoints with other nations.

Dependent territories 
In some cases, a dependent territory of one nation borders another nation.

Historical 
There were many countries that historically had only one neighbour. Some no longer exist while others now have either no land borders or borders with more than one nation due to border changes.

 Korea: bordered only China for several hundred years before 1860, after which a second international border with Russia appeared (approx.  long), according to the Convention of Peking. Following the division of Korea in 1945 only North Korea now shares this border.
 Ciskei: one of the Bantustans of South Africa; created under apartheid, reincorporated on April 27, 1994.
 Venda: another Bantustan, Venda was a true enclave bordering only South Africa and separated narrowly from Zimbabwe by the Madimbo corridor to the north; reincorporated on April 27, 1994.
 Newfoundland: with Canada, until March 31, 1949, when it became the Canadian province of Newfoundland (now named Newfoundland and Labrador).
Scotland and England: bordered each other until 1707 when they were united as Great Britain by the Acts of Union, see Anglo-Scottish border.
 Japan: bordered Russia on the island of Sakhalin from 1905 until 1910, until Japan inherited the China–North Korea border and the North Korea–Russia border upon the Japanese annexation of Korea. Both Sakhalin and Korea were relinquished after Japan's defeat in World War II in 1945. (See Karafuto Prefecture and Empire of Japan).
 Weihaiwei: 1898–1930, British colony on a leased territory from China's Qing dynasty. Transferred to the Republic of China in 1930.
 Tasmania: bordered only by the Colony of Victoria (on Boundary Islet), until the federation of the Commonwealth of Australia in 1901.

See also 
 Island country
 List of countries and territories by land borders
 Landlocked country
 List of countries and territories by land and maritime borders
 List of divided islands
 List of enclaves and exclaves
 List of island countries
 List of political and geographic borders

References 

Border only one other country
One